Benjamin W. Robbins is an American politician from the state of Alabama. He currently serves as a member of the Alabama House of Representatives, representing District 33, including parts of Coosa, Talladega, and Clay County.

Education 
Robbins is a seventh-generation Alabama native and a grandson of former Childersburg Mayor Robert Limbaugh. Robbins began his secondary education at Talladega High School in 1997, graduating in Spring 2001. Later that year, Robbins enrolled in Samford University with a major in history. He graduated four years later in 2005 with his Bachelor of Arts degree in history. Robbins then enrolled at Mississippi State University. Robbins graduated from Mississippi State with a Master of Arts in Modern American History in 2009. After his graduation, Robbins completed his education at St. Thomas University Law School from 2009 to 2012, graduating with a Juris Doctor degree.

Career 
Robbins began his career in the political field by becoming a legislative correspondent for Republican US Senator from Alabama Richard Shelby from 2007 to 2008. In 2014, Robbins started his own law firm in Sylacauga, Robbins & Robbins, Attorneys At Law. Robbins served in many community leadership roles within Sylacauga, including positions such as co-president of Leadership Sylacauga and Talladega Rotary Club past-president. Robbins took on his first electoral challenge when on September 25, 2017, he announced his candidacy for the Republican nomination for Alabama House District 33 against incumbent Representative Ronald Johnson. However, Robbins narrowly lost the primary election on June 5, 2018, earning 48.3% of the vote to Johnson's 51.7%. After the death of Representative Johnson on July 14, 2020, a special election to fill the vacant seat was scheduled for January 19, 2021. Robbins passed through the Republican Primary unopposed and faced Democrat Fred Crum. On January 19, 2021, Ben Robbins defeated his opponent, Fred Crum, 68.2% to 31.7%, winning the election decisively. Robbins took office on January 26, 2021, as State Representative for Alabama House District 33.

Committee Positions 
Robbins serves as a member of the Judiciary Committee and as a member of the Boards, Agencies, and Commissions Committee.

Elections

Alabama House of Representatives District 33

2018 Republican Primary

2021 Special Election

References

Republican Party members of the Alabama House of Representatives
21st-century American politicians
Living people
Year of birth missing (living people)